Tetramethyltin is an organometallic compound with the formula (CH3)4Sn. This liquid, one of the simplest organotin compounds, is useful for transition-metal mediated conversion of acid chlorides to methyl ketones and aryl halides to aryl methyl ketones.  It is volatile and toxic, so care should be taken when using it in the laboratory.

Synthesis and structure
Tetramethyltin is synthesized by reaction of the Grignard reagent methylmagnesium iodide, with tin tetrachloride, which is synthesized by reacting tin metal with chlorine gas.
4 CH3MgI  +  SnCl4  →  (CH3)4Sn  +  4 MgICl
In tetramethyltin, the metal surrounded by four methyl groups in a tetrahedral structure is a heavy analogue of neopentane.

Applications

Precursor to methyltin compounds
Tetramethyltin is a precursor to trimethyltin chloride (and related methyltin halides), which are precursors to other organotin compounds. These methyltin chlorides are prepared via the so-called Kocheshkov redistribution reaction.  Thus, (CH3)4Sn and SnCl4 are allowed to react at temperatures between 100 °C and 200 °C to give (CH3)3SnCl as a product:
SnCl4  +  3 (CH3)4Sn   →   4 (CH3)3SnCl

A second route to trimethyltin chloride utilizing tetramethyltin involves the reaction of mercury(II) chloride to react with (CH3)4Sn. 
4 HgCl2  +  4 (CH3)4Sn   →   4 Me3SnCl  +  4 MeHgCl

A variety of methyltin compounds are used as precursors for stabilizers in PVC. Di- and trimercaptotin compounds are used to inhibit the dehydrochlorination, which is the pathway for photolytic and thermal degradation of PVC.

Surface functionalization
Tetramethyltin decomposes in the gas phase at about 277 °C; (CH3)4Sn vapor reacts with silica to give a (CH3)3Sn-grafted solid.

(CH3)4Sn  +  ≡SiOH   →    ≡SiOSn(CH3)3  +  MeH

This reaction is also possible with other alkyl substituents. In a similar process, tetramethyltin has been used to functionalize certain zeolites at temperatures as low as −90 °C.

Applications in organic synthesis
In organic synthesis, tetramethyltin undergoes palladium-catalyzed coupling reactions with acid chlorides to give methyl ketones:
SnMe4  +  RCOCl  →  RCOMe  + Me3SnCl

References

Organotin compounds
Tin(IV) compounds
Methyl complexes